David Engel may refer to:

David Engel (actor), Broadway singer, dancer, and actor
David Engel (historian), American historian
David Engel (tennis), a retired Swedish tennis player